George Sluizer (25 June 1932 – 20 September 2014) was a French-born Dutch filmmaker whose credits included features as well as documentary films.

Career
Born in Paris, France, to a Dutch-Jewish father and a Norwegian mother, he was best known for directing two versions of The Vanishing, a 1988 Dutch-language release, originally titled Spoorloos, and the 1993 American version. Other feature films directed by Sluizer included Utz (1992) for producer John Goldschmidt, Crimetime (1995), and Dark Blood, which was discontinued after the death of its lead actor River Phoenix, but later completed and premiered at the Netherlands Film Festival in 2012. The film was shown two more times publicly on 2 October 2012 at the same festival.

From 2012 till 2014 he was part of the film jury for ShortCutz Amsterdam. An annual film festival promoting short films in Amsterdam, The Netherlands.

Director Dennis Alink made a documentary called Sluizer Speaks during the final years of Sluizer's life. It premiered two months after his death at the IDFA in Amsterdam.

Accusations against Ariel Sharon
Sluizer was accused by Israeli officials of a 'modern blood libel' for his claims – which in 2010 finally achieved front page level publicity in Israel – that he had witnessed the then Defense Minister Ariel Sharon personally shooting two Palestinian children from close range near the Sabra-Shatilla refugee camp in November 1982, after the Sabra and Shatila massacre.

Filmography

As director

Awards and nominations
 1988 - Golden Calf Best Film, Nederlands Film Festival, for Spoorloos
 1997 - Nomination Crystal Star, Brussels International Film Festival, for Mortinho por Chegar a Casa
 1998 - Nomination Golden Bear, Berlinale, for The Commissioner
 2002 - Nomination Golden Calf Best Film & Beste Director, Nederlands Film Festival, for La balsa de piedra
 2002 - Juryprize, Nederlands Film Festival, for La balsa de piedra
 2013 -  ShortCutz Amsterdam Career Award

References

External links
 
 Official George Sluizer website

1932 births
2014 deaths
Dutch documentary filmmakers
Dutch film directors
Dutch film producers
Dutch film editors
Dutch screenwriters
Dutch male screenwriters
Dutch male short story writers
Dutch people of Norwegian descent
Dutch Jews
20th-century Dutch people
Golden Calf winners
20th-century Dutch dramatists and playwrights
Dutch male dramatists and playwrights
20th-century Dutch short story writers
20th-century Dutch male writers